David Henry FitzRoy Somerset (19 June 1930 – 25 October 2014) was Chief Cashier of the Bank of England from 1980 to 1988. The signature of the Chief Cashier appears on British banknotes. Somerset was replaced as Chief Cashier by Malcolm Gill.

Somerset was the grandson of the third Baron Raglan. He was educated at Mount House School (now known as Mount Kelly) in Tavistock, Devon and Wellington College. He graduated from Peterhouse, Cambridge in 1956.

Somerset married Ruth Ivy Wildbur in 1955. They had two children:
 Louise Charlotte Somerset b. 28 August 1956
 Henry Robert Fitzroy Somerset b. 13 February 1961.

The family lived at White Wickets, Boarshead, near Crowborough.

In later life, he was made an emeritus fellow of Peterhouse, Cambridge from 1997 to 2014, and fellow 1988–97.

References

External links
http://www.the-saleroom.com/en-gb/auction-catalogues/sheffield-auction-gallery/catalogue-id-srsh10011/lot-3dafb222-1692-49f5-8885-a3f8009ce40b
http://oxfordindex.oup.com/view/10.1093/ww/9780199540884.013.U35630

1930 births
2014 deaths
Chief Cashiers of the Bank of England
People from Rotherfield
20th-century English businesspeople
People educated at Mount House School, Tavistock